A mobile station is a system in telecommunications comprising all user equipment and software needed to communicate with a mobile network.

Mobile station may also refer to:
Mobile station (Amtrak), a former Amtrak station in Mobile, Alabama
Gulf, Mobile and Ohio Passenger Terminal, another former train station in Mobile, Alabama
Mobile radio station, a radio station used in motion